The Turkish-Islamic Union for Religious Affairs (DİTİB;) is one of the largest Islamic organisations in Germany. Founded in 1984 as a branch of the Presidency of Religious Affairs in Ankara, it is an "arm" of the Turkish state. The headquarters are in Cologne-Ehrenfeld.

As of 2016, the DİTİB funds 900 mosques in Germany.

The imams and the religious teachers, officially classified as civil servants of the Turkish state, are trained in Ankara and sent to Germany from Turkey. DİTİB claims it is independent of the Government of Turkey. Because the state back then was almost bankrupt, the officials had to be paid with money from the Muslim World League, which provoked protest from secularists. The fixation on Turkey and the Turkish language proved to be a handicap, because other Islamic organisations used German language in public. The usage of German was seen by many to be more dialogue-friendly.

Homepages of local DİTİB chapters have featured christophobic, antisemitic and anti-Western hate speech.

Organisation 
DITIB received state aid from the Federal Ministry of the Interior in Germany: in the period 2012 to 2018, DİTİB received about €6 million. When it was initially founded, around 230 associations were members; by 2005 the number was 870. The local associations are registered independently for legal and financial purposes, but share the goals and principles of DİTİB as their foundation. They also acknowledge DİTİB as their umbrella organisation. It has a number of social and religious institutes.

In 2018, Federal Ministry of the Interior cut all funds after DİTİB had been involved in a number of controversies, such as refusing to take part in a Cologne anti-terror march in 2017.

2004 rally 
Under the presidency of Rıdvan Çakır, DİTİB tries to present itself as a more integrated actor in German society. DİTİB was one of the initiators of the mass-event "Gemeinsam für Frieden und gegen Terror" (en: "Together for Peace and against Terror"). Over 20,000 Muslims participated in this demonstration, which was held on November 21, 2004 in Cologne. Participants who gave speeches included the Green Party politician Claudia Roth, Bavaria's Interior Minister Günther Beckstein and Fritz Behrens. The goal was to signal the disapproval of the use of violence in the name of Islam. It was one of the largest demonstrations of its kind in the history of Germany.

See also 
 Islam in Germany

References

External links 

 DİTİB Homepage

Islamic organizations established in 1984
Islamic organisations based in Germany
Germany–Turkey relations
Organisations based in Cologne
Turkish diaspora in Germany
1984 establishments in West Germany